The Scott Sociable was an English automobile manufactured from 1921 to 1925 by the Scott Autocar Company of Bradford, Yorkshire, an offshoot of the Scott Motorcycle Company.

During World War I Alfred Angas Scott had made sidecar machine gun carriers. From these he developed a three-wheel car with two wheels in line and a third one set alongside but slightly behind the other rear wheel, all supported by a triangulated tubular steel frame. Although the layout still resembled that of a motorcycle and sidecar combination, it had wheel steering by rack and pinion. Its power was supplied by the Scott Company's own water-cooled 578 cc twin-cylinder two-stroke engine with drive transmitted through a three-speed gearbox to the offside rear wheel by shaft. There was no reverse gear. Turning was dangerous at speed.

The vehicle was intended for military use, but orders failed to come, so he converted it to civilian use and announced it in 1916 as the Sociable, but production had to wait until 1921. About 200 were made before production stopped in 1924. Complete cars cost £273 in 1921 falling to £135 by 1924.

See also
 List of car manufacturers of the United Kingdom
 List of motorcycles of the 1920s
List of motorized trikes

References 

David Burgess Wise, The New Illustrated Encyclopedia of Automobiles.
G.N. Georgano (ed) 'Beaulieu Encyclopedia of the Automobile', 2000, HMSO London,

External links

Defunct motor vehicle manufacturers of England
Scott
Manufacturing companies based in Bradford